Xilian Township is an rural township in Sangzhi County, Zhangjiajie, Hunan Province, China.

Administrative division
The township is divided into 10 villages, the following areas: Shimenya Village, Fenghe Village, Yueyan Village, Yujing Village, Zhongli Village, Jinzhu Village, Luoziling Village, Shuanglong Village, Shuanghe Village, and Liushu Village (石门亚村、丰合村、月岩村、玉京村、中里村、金竹村、罗子岭村、双龙村、双合村、柳树村).

References

External links

Former towns and townships of Sangzhi County